Chumaerhe railway station is a purported railway station on the Chinese Qinghai–Tibet Railway. As of March 2012 there is no evidence from Google Earth imagery of either a siding or station construction near this location.

Station layout

See also

 Qinghai–Tibet Railway
 List of stations on Qinghai–Tibet railway

References

Railway stations in Qinghai
Stations on the Qinghai–Tibet Railway